The 2021–22 Real Madrid Club de Fútbol season was the 118th season in existence and the club's 91st consecutive season in the top flight of Spanish football. In addition to the domestic league, Real Madrid participated in this season's editions of the Copa del Rey, the Supercopa de España, and the UEFA Champions League.

This season saw Carlo Ancelotti return to the club, having led it to La Décima in his first spell. On the domestic front, he delivered two trophies out of possible three, winning La Liga and the Supercopa de España. With that, Ancelotti became the first manager in Real Madrid history to have won all of the six available top-tier major trophies. In the Champions League, Madrid produced one of the most memorable runs of all time, defeating pre-tournament favorites Paris Saint-Germain, defending champions and favorites Chelsea, Premier League champions and heavy favorites Manchester City, all in dramatic fashion, and setting up the final against Liverpool, who were once again widely considered as favorites, in a rematch of their 2018 encounter. A lone Vinícius goal in the second half sealed the 14th European Cup for Los Blancos, their fifth in nine years. This was also Carlo Ancelotti's fourth Champions League title as coach, making him the most successful manager in the competition's history. Real also claimed their fourth ever European double (after 1956–57, 1957–58, and 2016–17).

This season was the first since 2004–05 without former captain Sergio Ramos, who departed for Paris Saint-Germain in the summer and first since 2010–11 without the Frenchman Raphaël Varane, with the two having been Madrid's first choice center-back pairing for years, leaving in the same transfer window.

Summary

Pre-season
On 27 May, after the conclusion of the 2020–21 season, Zinedine Zidane announced that he would leave Real Madrid. The next day, Real Madrid announced the signing of David Alaba on a free transfer from Bayern Munich. Alaba signed on  a five-year contract. Carlo Ancelotti returned as the head coach on 1 June, having already led Madrid in 2013–15. On 16 June, the club announced that Sergio Ramos would leave after 16 years of service.

August
The first match of the season was won 4–1 against Alavés on 14 August. Karim Benzema scored a brace, with the other goals coming from Nacho and Vinícius Júnior. Raphaël Varane left Madrid on the same day, to join Manchester United. On 20 August, Martin Ødegaard left the club to join Arsenal. Two goals from Vinícius and a goal from Gareth Bale saved Madrid a point in a 3–3 draw with Levante on 22 August. Six days later, a goal from Dani Carvajal secured three points for Madrid in a 1–0 win over Real Betis. On 31 August, Eduardo Camavinga joined the club on a transfer from Rennes.

September
A hat-trick from Benzema, a strike from Vinícius and a debut goal from Camavinga gave Madrid a 5–2 win over Celta Vigo on 12 September, their first game at the Santiago Bernabéu Stadium in 560 days following extensive renovations. Three days later, a late goal from Rodrygo got Madrid off to a winning start in the UEFA Champions League, with a 1–0 win over Inter Milan. On 19 September, two late goals from Benzema and Vinícius gave Madrid a 2–1 win over Valencia. Three days later, Mallorca was defeated 6–1, with a hat-trick from Marco Asensio, a brace from Benzema, and a goal from Isco. A home match against Villarreal on 25 September ended in a 0–0 draw, which was Madrid's first official game of the season without scoring a goal. On 28 September, Madrid suffered a 1–2 upset home loss to Sheriff Tiraspol in the Champions League, where Benzema converted a penalty to score the momentary equalizer.

October
The next game on 3 October ended in another loss, a 1–2 defeat to Espanyol in which Benzema scored the lone goal for Madrid. On 19 October, Madrid defeated Shakhtar Donetsk 5–0 away from home on Matchday 3 of the Champions League. Vinícius scored a brace and the other goals came from Benzema and Rodrygo, alongside an own goal. Five days later, the first El Clásico of the season against Barcelona at Camp Nou was won 2–1 after goals from David Alaba, a debut one for the Austrian, and Lucas Vázquez. The home game against Osasuna on 27 October ended in a goalless draw. Elche were defeated three days later on the road with a score of 2–1 thanks to a Vinícius brace.

November
On 3 November, Madrid defeated Shakhtar 2–1 at home after a brace from Benzema. The first goal was Madrid's 1000th in their Champions League history. Three days later, Rayo Vallecano were defeated 2–1 at home after goals from Toni Kroos and Benzema. On 21 November, Madrid defeated Granada 4–1 away from home. The goals came from Asensio, Nacho, Vinícius and Ferland Mendy. Three days later, Sheriff was defeated 3–0 on the road in the Champions League with Alaba, Kroos and Benzema scoring the goals. With that win, Madrid secured their place in the knockout stages for the 25th time in a row. On 28 November, Sevilla were defeated 2–1 at the Bernabéu with goals from Benzema and Vinícius.

December
On the first day of the new month, a Benzema goal secured Madrid a 1–0 home victory over Athletic Bilbao. Three days later, another Basque team, Real Sociedad, was beaten 2–0 at Anoeta with goals from Vinícius and Luka Jović. Goals from Kroos and Asensio on 7 December secured Madrid a first-place finish in their Champions League group with a 2–0 home win over Inter. On 12 December, Benzema and Asensio scored for a 2–0 Madrid Derby win against Atlético Madrid at the Bernabéu. The home game against Cádiz on 19 December ended in a goalless draw. Bilbao were defeated 2–1 away from home on the last matchday of 2021, with Benzema scoring a brace.

January
On the second day of the new year, Madrid lost 0–1 away to Getafe, suffering the first defeat since 3 October, a loss at Espanyol. The round of 32 of the Copa del Rey was a rematch against Alcoyano on 5 January, who eliminated Madrid at the same stage last year. This time Madrid won 3–1, with goals from Militão, Asensio and an own goal. Three days later, Madrid defeated Valencia 4–1 at home after braces from Vinícius and Benzema, with the latter scoring his 300th goal for the club. On 12 January, the first semi-final of the 2021–22 Supercopa de España was won 3–2 after extra time against Barcelona. Vinícius, Benzema and Federico Valverde scored the goals. The following day, Madrid terminated the loan agreement with Roma for Borja Mayoral and sent him to Getafe until 30 June 2022. On 16 January, Madrid won their first trophy of the season, the Supercopa de España, defeating Athletic Bilbao 2–0 in the final with goals from Luka Modrić and Benzema. Four days later, Madrid faced Elche away from home in the Copa del Rey round of 16 and won 2–1 with a late extra time comeback after goals from Isco and Eden Hazard. On 23 January, Madrid played another match against Elche, this time in the league at the Bernabéu, and made another last minute comeback. The final score was 2–2, with Modrić and Militão scoring the goals.

February
On 3 February, Real Madrid faced Athletic Bilbao at the San Mamés in the Copa del Rey quarter-finals in the first game of the month, making it the fourth meeting between the two teams in two months. Madrid lost 0–1 and were eliminated, meaning they had progressed past the quarter-final stage only once after their victory in 2014. Three days later, Madrid hosted Granada in a league match and won 1–0, with the only goal coming from Asensio. On 12 February, Madrid played against Villarreal away from home, with the game ending in a goalless stalemate. On 15 February, Real met Paris Saint-Germain at the Parc des Princes in the first leg of the Champions League round of 16. A lone Mbappe goal at the death gave Paris the advantage. Four days later, Madrid defeated Alaves 3–0 at home, with Asensio, Vinícius and Benzema scoring the goals. On 26 February, Madrid faced Rayo Vallecano on the road and clinched the three points with a late goal from Benzema.

March 
On 5 March, goals from Camavinga, Modrić, Benzema and Asensio helped Madrid to take a smashing 4–1 victory over Real Sociedad in the first game of the month, a day before the club's 120th birthday. Four days later, Madrid faced Paris Saint-Germain at the Bernabéu in the second leg of the Champions League round of 16. A hat-trick from Benzema powered Real's late comeback, with the team winning 3–1 (3–2 on aggregate) and progressing to the quarter-finals. On 14 March, Madrid defeated Mallorca away from home, with Benzema scoring twice and Vinícius also on the scoresheet. On 20 March, Madrid hosted the third El Clásico of the season and lost 0–4. This was Real's first Clásico loss since 0–1 in March 2019 and their biggest since 1–5 in October 2018.

April
On 2 April, after the international break, Madrid beat Celta Vigo 2–1 away from home, with Benzema scoring two goals from the penalty spot. Four days later, Madrid met Chelsea away from home in the Champions League quarter-finals first leg, rematching the last season's semi-finals. Madrid won 3–1 thanks to the second Benzema Champions League knockout hat-trick in a row, making him the first player to achieve that feat since Cristiano Ronaldo in the 2016–17 edition. On 9 April, goals from Casemiro and Vázquez gave Madrid a 2–0 home win over Getafe. Three days later, Madrid faced Chelsea at home in the second leg of the Champions League quarter-finals. Real suffered a 2–3 loss after extra time, but managed to win 5–4 on aggregate to reach the semi-finals with a late Rodrygo goal and an extra time header from Benzema. On 17 April, goals from Rodrygo and Nacho and a late winner from Benzema helped Madrid produce a comeback and beat Sevilla 3–2 away from home to secure their third consecutive win at the Ramon Sánchez Pizjuan, which has not happened in over 30 years, and move closer to the title. Three days later, Madrid got a 3–1 away win over Osasuna after goals from Alaba, Asensio and Vázquez. On 26 April, Madrid played the first leg of the Champions League semi-finals against Manchester City on the away soil. The match ended in a 3–4 loss, with a Benzema brace and a goal from Vinícius. On 30 April, Real Madrid sealed their 35th La Liga title with a 4–0 win over Espanyol at the Bernabéu after a brace from Rodrygo and goals from Asensio and Benzema. With four games to spare, this was Real's earliest league title since 1990.

May
In the first match of the month, on 4 May, Madrid faced Manchester City in the second leg of the Champions League semi-finals. Real produced another late comeback, with a brace from Rodrygo moving the game to extra time where a Benzema penalty sealed the victory, qualifying Madrid for the final, 17th overall for them and first since 2018, defeating their opponents 3–1 in the match and 6–5 on aggregate. Real Madrid became the first team to lose three knockout games en route to the Champions League final since the current format was introduced in the 2003–04 season. This was also the first time in the club's history that Real qualified for the Champions League final after losing the first leg of the semi-finals, having failed to do so on eight previous occasions. Four days later, Madrid lost 0–1 versus Atlético away from home. This was Real's first ever derby loss at the Wanda Metropolitano and also the first since the 2018 UEFA Super Cup. On 12 May, Madrid demolished Levante in a 6–0 home win, with a hat-trick from Vinícius, the first in his career, and goals from Mendy, Rodrygo and Benzema, who equalled his Real Madrid goalscoring record with Raúl's. Three days later, Madrid drew Cádiz 1–1 away from home with a goal from Mariano. On 20 May, in the season's last league game, Madrid faced Real Betis at the Bernabéu, with the match ending in a 0–0 draw. For the first time since the 1983–84 season, no one in the team was sent off during their La Liga campaign.

On 28 May, Madrid faced Liverpool in the Champions League final in a rematch of their 2018 encounter. A lone Vinícius goal sealed the 14th European Cup for Los Blancos, their fifth in nine years, and Ancelotti's second in charge, making him the first manager to win four Champions League trophies (with Milan in 2003 and 2007, and with Madrid in 2014 and 2022). Despite Real Madrid's status as the most decorated team in European Cup / Champions League history, they were considered underdogs in this season's campaign, rated no higher than seventh prior to the start of the group stages in September 2021 (after, in order, Paris Saint-Germain, Manchester City, Bayern Munich, Chelsea, Liverpool, and Manchester United). Prior to the start of the knockout phase in February 2022, they were again seventh, behind Manchester City, Bayern Munich, Liverpool, Chelsea, Paris Saint-Germain, and Ajax, in addition to having been considered underdogs to all of the teams they faced thereafter. As such, Madrid's run can be considered among the most improbable ones in modern Champions League history.

Players

Transfers

In

Out

Contract renewals

Pre-season and friendlies

Competitions

Overview

La Liga

League table

Results summary

Results by round

Matches
The league fixtures were announced on 30 June 2021.

Score overview

Copa del Rey

Madrid entered the tournament in the round of 32, as they had qualified for the 2021–22 Supercopa de España.

Supercopa de España

UEFA Champions League

Group stage

The group stage draw was held on 26 August 2021.

Knockout phase

Round of 16
The draw for the round of 16 was held on 13 December 2021.

Quarter-finals
The draw for the quarter-finals and semi-finals was held on 18 March 2022.

Semi-finals

Final

Statistics

Squad statistics

† Player left Madrid during the season

Goals

Clean sheets

Disciplinary record

Notes

References

External links

Real Madrid CF seasons
Real Madrid
Real Madrid
Spanish football championship-winning seasons
UEFA Champions League-winning seasons